Jesup is a city in Wayne County, Georgia, United States. The population was 9,809 at the 2020 census.  The city is the county seat of Wayne County.

History
By February 1869, Willis Clary had begun building a two-story hotel near the junction of Macon and Brunswick Railroad and the Atlantic and Gulf Railroad and four stores had sprung up in the area. Clary became a driving force for the establishment of what would become Jesup and was its first mayor.

By September 1869, the town included five stores, a sawmill, and a railroad eating house in addition to Clary's hotel. By December 1869 the community had become known as Jesup.

Jesup was named for Thomas Jesup, a general during the Second Seminole War.

The area was then part of Appling County, Georgia. On August 27, 1872, eastern sections of Appling land districts 3 and 4 were added to Wayne County. In 1873, the seat of Wayne County was transferred to Jesup from Waynesville.

Geography

Jesup is located at  (31.601866, -81.885070).

It is 35 miles west of Hinesville and 12 Miles Southwest of Ludowici, GA

Demographics

2020 census

As of the 2020 United States census, there were 9,809 people, 3,754 households, and 2,365 families residing in the city.

2010 census
As of the census of 2010, there were 10,214 people, 2,921 households, and 2,015 families residing in the city. The racial makeup of the city was 49.1% White, 39.6% Black, 0.3% Native American, 0.9% Asian, 0.9% Pacific Islander, 0.0% from other races, and 1.8% from two or more races. Hispanic or Latino of any race were 9.2% of the population.

There were 2,921 households, out of which 33.1% had children under the age of 18 living with them, 43.6% were married couples living together, 21.6% had a female householder with no husband present, and 31.0% were non-families. 27.8% of all households were made up of individuals, and 13.1% had someone living alone who was 65 years of age or older.  The average household size was 2.54 and the average family size was 3.09.

In the city, the population was spread out, with 23.2% under the age of 18, 8.9% from 18 to 24, 33.1% from 25 to 44, 22.3% from 45 to 64, and 12.5% who were 65 years of age or older.  The median age was 36 years.  For every 100 females age 18 and over, there were 135.4 males.

The median income for a household in the city was $28,833, and the median income for a family was $35,955. Males had a median income of $35,191 versus $20,571 for females. The per capita income for the city was $15,144.  About 19.4% of families and 21.8% of the population were below the poverty line, including 30.1% of those under age 18 and 19.3% of those age 65 or over.

Government and infrastructure
The Federal Bureau of Prisons operates the Federal Correctional Institution in Jesup. The United States Postal Service operates the Jesup Post Office.

Education 

The Wayne County School District holds pre-school to grade twelve, and consists of a pre-K center, five elementary schools, two middle schools, a high school, and an academy school. The district has 320 full-time teachers and over 5,256 students.

Jesup is home to Coastal Pines Technical College as well as one high school, Wayne County High School, which is located within the city limits. This complex replaced the original Wayne County High School on Orange Street, and was completed in 2002. In 2014, the county school system took bids for asbestos removal and the demolition of buildings belonging to the old high school. Until its demolition, the original facility was still providing usefulness, housing the Jesup Police, the Boys and Girls Club of Wayne County, and the Three Rivers Regional Library System's Regional Office. The Jesup Police Department is now located in the facilities previously housing Jesup Elementary, at 642 E. Plum Street. All sporting events except basketball and tennis and track including football, baseball, soccer, and softball, are held at the original Wayne County High School complex.

The Wayne County Public Library borders the sports complex.

Transportation
Amtrak's Silver Meteor passenger train stops at the Jesup Amtrak Station.

United States highways that pass through Jesup are U.S. Highway 25, U.S. Highway 84, U.S. Highway 301, and U.S. Highway 341.

Jesup-Wayne County Airport, also known as William A. Zorn Airport (FAA location identifier: JES), is located south of town.

Gallery

Notable people
Ed Bacon - progressive Episcopal priest and author of 8 Habits of Love: Open Your Heart, Open Your Mind
Randall Bramblett - musician
Tasha Cobbs - Grammy-winning gospel singer
Len Hauss - former NFL football player
Tre' Jackson - current NFL football player
Greyson Lambert- former University of Georgia quarterback
David Larson- Olympian Gold medalist in the 1984 Summer Olympics
T. Y. McGill - current NFL football player
Lindsay Scott - former NFL football player
Erwin C. Surrency - legal historian, author, professor
John Warren - former NFL player
Drew Worsham - musician

References

External links

 City of Jesup

Cities in Georgia (U.S. state)
Micropolitan areas of Georgia (U.S. state)
Cities in Wayne County, Georgia
County seats in Georgia (U.S. state)